Itunundu is an administrative ward in the Iringa Rural district of the Iringa Region of Tanzania. In 2016 the Tanzania National Bureau of Statistics report there were 9,833 people in the ward, from 000 in 2012.

Villages / vitongoji 
The ward has 3 villages and 16 vitongoji.

 Itunundu
 Changalawe
 Ikolongo
 Isele
 Kibuegele
 Kivukokalo
 Majengo
 Mbuyuni
 Mkwajuni
 Kimande
 Gundamnani
 Kikuluhe
 Kimande
 Mjimwema
 Mwaitenga
 Mbuyuni
 Igodikafu
 Mbuyuni
 Ndolela

References 

Wards of Iringa Region